Scott Strazzante (born March 11, 1964) is an American photojournalist at the San Francisco Chronicle. As a member of the Chicago Tribune staff, he co-won the 2008 Pulitzer Prize for Investigative Reporting for a series about faulty government regulation of dangerously defective toys, cribs and car seats.

Education
He grew up in Chicago and graduated from Ripon College, where he majored in business management and art (1982–86).

Career
He has been published in National Geographic Magazine, Mother Jones Magazine, Sports Illustrated, and other publications.
Strazzante's Common Ground project has been published in National Geographic and made into a video by MediaStorm.

He is a former Illinois Press Photographer Association President (2001–2010) and National Press Photographers Association Region 5 Director and Associate Director (1999–2005).

Strazzante is a prolific street photographer using his iPhone with Hipstamatic app.

Awards
He is an eleven-time Illinois Photographer of the Year.
He was awarded National Newspaper Photographer of the Year in 2000 and National Newspaper Photographer of the Year runner-up in 2007.

References

External links 
 Chicago Tribune Shooting from the Hip blog
 aphotoaday Interview
 Chicago Tribune- "New York Remembers 9/11"
 Scott Strazzante, photoshelter.com

American photojournalists
Living people
1964 births